The autograph suit of Sandy Powell is a cream calico toile (a tailor's mock-up) two-piece suit, designed and worn by multi-Oscar and BAFTA-winning costume designer Sandy Powell. During the film awards season in early 2020, Powell wore the suit and collected celebrities' autographs on it, signed with permanent marker. The suit was then auctioned to raise funds for the purchase of artist, filmmaker and gay rights activist Derek Jarman's cottage at Dungeness in Kent, England. The suit was bought by Edwina Dunn, who then donated it to the Theatre and Performance Collection of the Victoria and Albert Museum (V&A) in London. In April 2022 the suit featured in an episode of the BBC Two series, Secrets of the Museum.

Origin

In 1985 artist, filmmaker and gay rights activist Derek Jarman gave Sandy Powell her first job in the film industry, as the costume designer for his film Caravaggio. The year Caravaggio was released, Jarman was diagnosed with HIV. Shortly afterwards, he moved into Prospect Cottage, a Victorian fisherman's cottage on the shingle beach at Dungeness in Kent, in the shadow of Dungeness Nuclear Power Station. Jarman died in 1994, and the cottage was bequeathed to his partner Keith Collins. The house was put up for sale in 2018 after Collins' death, its interior still containing Jarman's belongings, art and materials, and artwork by Jarman's friends and admirers, including Maggi Hambling, John Maybury, Gus Van Sant and Richard Hamilton.

In January 2020, with Prospect Cottage at risk of being sold privately and its contents dispersed, the Art Fund began a fundraising drive to secure the cottage's future. To help with this, Powell decided to collect celebrities' signatures on a suit toile she had designed (getting the signatures while wearing it), and then auction the suit. As Powell was to be awarded the Dilys Powell Award for Excellence in Film at the Critics' Circle awards, and was nominated for Best Costume Design for The Irishman at both the BAFTAs and the Oscars, she had plenty of opportunity to collect autographs at the coming awards ceremonies.

The suit
The two-piece suit (jacket and trousers) is a toile, a tailor's mock-up to test a design before expensive material is committed. The toile is the toile for the suits that Powell wore to the 2017 and 2019 Oscars and BAFTAS. The toile is made of cream calico with rough stitching, with the jacket fixed by two large safety pins. It was deliberately chosen to be a "blank canvas" on which to collect signatures. Over a six-week period during the 2020 film awards season, Powell attended The Critics' Circle awards ceremony on 30 January 2020, the 2020 BAFTAs award show on 2 February 2020 and the 2020 Oscars ceremony on 9 February 2020, plus other events, and collected over 200 signatures on the suit. Powell noted that some people chose where to sign, while others were told, with "only girls on the bum".

The suit was auctioned online between 4 and 11 March 2020 by Phillips Auction House, after being displayed in the foyer of its gallery in Berkeley Square, London, along with four handwritten keys identifying almost all the signatures on the various parts of the suit. The suit sold for £16,000. It was purchased by Edwina Dunn, who then donated it to the V&A Museum, on behalf of The Female Lead, an educational charity that drives change and equality for women. The suit underwent conservation cleaning at the museum, and Powell visited the museum 
to help choose the mannequin on which it was to be displayed. Powell's handwritten keys were to be mounted alongside the suit in the gallery when it was to go on display. The suit was placed on display in April 2022 in Room 104 of the V&A's Theatre & Performance galleries.

The campaign to save Prospect Cottage was a success, and it will host residencies for artists, academics and gardeners.

List of most of the signatories on the suit
By the time of its auction there were over 200 signatures on the suit. Powell noted in the 2022 television programme Secrets of the Museum that some of the signatures had yet to be identified. Those who signed it include:

Matt Aitkin
Waad Al-Kateab
Marco Alessi
Alfie Allen
Pedro Almodóvar
Joe Alwyn
Elena Andreicheva
Aziz Ansari
Darren Aronofsky
Colleen Atwood
Amani Ballour
Baz Bamigboye
Antonio Banderas
Elizabeth Banks
Daniel Battsek
Noah Baumbach
Jarin Blaschke
Bong Joon-ho
Shane Boris
Edith Bowman
Danny Boyle
Javier Braier
Mark Bridges
Derek Brown
Andrew Buckland
Jessie Buckley
Gerard Butler
Greg Butler
Asa Butterfield
Kate Byers
Ruth Carter
Dean-Charles Chapman
Gwendoline Christie
Michele Clapton
Patricia Clarkson
Olivia Colman
Paul Croal
Alfonso Cuarón
Beverly D'Angelo
Fejmi Daut
Robert De Niro
Roger Deakin
Lily Rose Depp
Laura Dern
Alexandre Desplat
Kaitlyn Dever
Leonardo DiCaprio
Adam Driver
Jacqueline Durran
Finola Dwyer
Sigrid Dyekjaer
Carol Dysinger
Billie Eilish
Robert Eggers
Cynthia Erivo
Leandro Estebecorena
Elle Fanning
Beanie Feldstein
Julian Fellowes
Peter Fillingham
Dexter Fletcher
David Furnish
Kay Georgiou
Greta Gerwig
Terry Gilliam
Dennis Glassner
Jinko Gotoh
Stephane Grabli
Stephen Graham
Richard E. Grant
Regina Graves
Roman Griffin Davis
John Hamm
John Haptas
Woody Harrelson
Pippa Harris
Pablo Helman
Paul Herman
David Heyman
Joanna Hogg
Pam Hogg
Matthew Jacobs Morgan
Kyle James
Mark Jenkin
Scarlett Johansson
Elton John
Andrew R. Jones
Daniel Kaluuya
Asif Kapadia
Elizabeth Karlsen
Harvey Keitel
Duncan Kenworthy
Mark Kermode
Stephanie Kurtzuba
Nicki Ledermann
Spike Lee
Matt Lefebvre
Kasi Lemmons
Damian Lewis
Barbara Ling
Samir Ljuma
Courtney Love
Ladj Ly
Callum MacDougal
George MacKay 
Tod Maitland
Rami Malek
Rooney Mara
John Maybury
Helen McCrory
Michael McCusker
Shannon McIntosh
Debbie McWilliams
Sam Mendes (twice)
Liz Miller
Kylie Minogue
Janelle Monáe
Anne Morgan
Steven A. Morrow
Sophie Muller
Smriti Mundhra
Kathrine Narducci
Andy Nelson
Mark Nielsen
Jehane Noujaim
Sergio Pablos
Al Pacino
Anna Paquin
David Parfitt
Amy Pascal
Tiago Pavan
Christopher Peterson
Arianne Phillips
Todd Phillips
Joaquin Phoenix
Brad Pitt
Billy Porter
Sally Potter
Sandy Powell
Rodrigo Prieto
Jonathan Pryce
Tom Rand
Jeff Reichert
Nick Rhodes
Jonas Rivera
Margot Robbie
Marisa Roman
Ray Romano
Saoirse Ronan
Jane Rosenthal
Mayes Rubeo
Kristine Samuelson
Lee Sandales
Ted Sarandos
Thelma Schoonmaker
Stephen Schwartz
Martin Scorsese
Jeremy Scott
Tracey Seaward
Brian Selznick
Andy Serkis
Bob Shaw
Lawrence Sher
David Shields
Peggy Siegal
Matt Smith
Jason Solomons
Mark Strong
Tilda Swinton
Honor Swinton Byrne
Sarah Swords
Peter Swords King
Annie Symons
Quentin Tarantino
Bernie Taupin
Jany Temime
Jayne-Ann Tenggren
Charlize Theron
Emma Tillinger
Dominic Tuohy
Tracey Ullman
Donatella Versace
Tristan Versluis
Ra Vincent
Linn Waite
Taika Waititi
David Walliams
Micheal Ward
Dianne Warren
Rebel Wilson
Stuart Wilson
Chelsea Winstanley
Jaime Winstone
Ray Winstone
Stephen Woolley
Steven Zaillian
Renée Zellweger

See also
 List of individual dresses

References

External links 
Sandy Powell's Instagram post showing her annotated identification of the signatures
The suit featured in the BBC series Secrets of the Museum (Series 3, Episode 2: 08:42–13:39; 34:11–36:52; 45:55–52:01).
BBC publicity for the Secrets of the Museum episode featuring the suit
Phillips auction page for the suit
V&A Accession page for the suit

Individual suits
Outfits worn at the Academy Awards ceremonies
2020s clothing
2020 in fashion
Film memorabilia
Collections of the Victoria and Albert Museum